Oney  may refer to:

 Oney, France, a subsidiary of French Auchan Holding and Banque Accord
 Oney, Oklahoma, an unincorporated community in Oklahoma
 "Oney" (song), a song written by Jerry Chesnut and sung by Johnny Cash, 1972
 Oney Judge, an enslaved lady's maid, to first lady Martha Washington, who liberated herself
 Oney Lorcan, professional wrestler currently signed with WWE
 Down Oney, Miss Montana USA 1954
 Oney High School, a school in Albert, Oklahoma
 Oney Guillen, son of MLB manager Ozzie Guillén
 Chris O'Neill (Oney), an Irish YouTuber with the channels OneyNG and OneyPlays.

See also 
 Saint-Martin-d'Oney